Phillip Rudolph van der Merwe (born 3 June 1985 in Potchefstroom) is a South African rugby union rugby player who plays in the lock position for French Top 14 side .

Career

Free State Cheetahs / Cheetahs

He made his first class debut for them in the 2006 Vodacom Cup – eventually starting eleven matches and playing off the bench on two occasions – and also made his Currie Cup debut in the second half of 2006, three times appearing as a replacement during the competition.

In 2007, he got his first taste of Super Rugby, starting two matches for the  during the 2007 Super 14 season.

He made three appearances for the Cheetahs during the 2008 Super 14 season and also scored his first try in Super Rugby. He played a bigger part in their Currie Cup campaign in 2008, making seven appearances.

Blue Bulls / Bulls

He immediately established himself as a first-choice player for them, making eleven starts and two substitute appearances in the 2009 Currie Cup Premier Division.

He became an important part of the Bulls side over the next few years, making 75 appearances for the side in Super Rugby competitions between 2010 and 2015. He also featured in 39 first class matches for the Blue Bulls between 2009 and 2012, with national team call-ups and injury preventing him from playing for them in 2013 and 2014.

Clermont

Shortly before the 2015 Super Rugby season, the  announced that Van der Merwe would leave after the 2015 Currie Cup Premier Division to take up a contract with French Top 14 side . He was later given an early release from his contract and made the move to Clermont during the Currie Cup campaign.

Representative rugby

On 12 June 2010, he played his first test for the South African national team, the Springboks, against France. He missed out on selection to the 2011 Rugby World Cup, but established himself as a regular for the team over the next few years, appearing in 36 test matches prior to his move to Clermont in 2015.

Personal

His father Flippie was also a rugby player, making six appearances for South Africa between 1981 and 1989.

References

External links

Flip van der Merwe at Springbok Rugby Hall of Fame
Flip van der Merwe at thebulls.co.za
Flip van der Merwe at skysports.com
Flip van der Merwe at itsrugby.co.uk

1985 births
Living people
Afrikaner people
Alumni of Grey College, Bloemfontein
Blue Bulls players
Bulls (rugby union) players
Cambridge University R.U.F.C. players
Cheetahs (rugby union) players
Free State Cheetahs players
Rugby union locks
Rugby union players from Potchefstroom
South Africa international rugby union players
South African expatriate rugby union players
South African people of Dutch descent
South African rugby union players